Graham John Hurst (born 23 November 1967) is an English former professional footballer who played in the Football League for Rochdale as a midfielder.

References

Graham Hurst, Neil Brown
profile at Mossley AFC

1967 births
Living people
Footballers from Oldham
English footballers
Association football midfielders
Rochdale A.F.C. players
Mossley A.F.C. players
Oldham Borough F.C. players
English Football League players